Cut the Cake is the third album released by Average White Band, released in 1975. This album's hit title track reached #10 on the Billboard pop singles chart. It was dedicated to "our friend and brother Robbie McIntosh."

Recording notes

The follow-up album to the immensely successful  AWB in 1974, recording was plagued by creative and artistic differences, with several members of the band walking out of the studio on three occasions.  One point of conflict was the band's mourning for original drummer, Robbie McIntosh, who died of a heroin overdose in 1974.  Producer Arif Mardin considered pulling the plug on the project due to this tension but ultimately persevered and oversaw its completion.

Track listing
Side A
"Cut the Cake" (Average White Band, Gorrie, McIntosh) – 4:07
"School Boy Crush" (Average White Band, Stuart, Ferrone, Gorrie)  – 4:58
"It's A Mystery" (Stuart, Average White Band, McIntosh) – 3:34
"Groovin' the Night Away" (Average White Band, Stuart) – 3:42
"If I Ever Lose This Heaven" (Leon Ware, Pam Sawyer) – 5:00
Side B
"Why" (Ball, Stuart, Gorrie) – 3:57
"High Flyin' Woman" (Average White Band, McIntyre, Gorrie) – 3:47
"Cloudy" (Stuart, Gorrie) – 4:18
"How Sweet Can You Get" (Ball, Stuart, Gorrie) – 3:57
"When They Bring Down the Curtain" (Gorrie, Ball) – 4:42

Personnel
Average White Band
Alan Gorrie – vocals, bass, guitar on "Cut the Cake" and "School Boy Crush"
Hamish Stuart – vocals, guitar, bass on "Cut the Cake" and "School Boy Crush"
Roger Ball – keyboards, synthesizer, alto and baritone saxophones, arranger (Dundee horns)
Malcolm Duncan – tenor saxophone
Onnie McIntyre – guitar, backing vocals
Steve Ferrone – drums, percussion
with:
Ray Barretto – congas on "It's a Mystery" and "When They Bring Down the Curtain"
Technical
Gene Paul - engineer, recording
Neal Schwartz, Peter Granet - additional recording
Bob Defrin - art direction
Vincent Topazio - cover illustration

Charts

Singles

See also
List of number-one R&B albums of 1975 (U.S.)

References

External links
 Average White Band-Cut The Cake at Discogs

1975 albums
Average White Band albums
Albums produced by Arif Mardin
Atlantic Records albums